Pink Hill Airport  is a privately owned, public use airport located one nautical mile (2 km) east of the central business district of Pink Hill, a town in Lenoir County, North Carolina, United States.

Facilities and aircraft 
Pink Hill Airport covers an area of 5 acres (2 ha) at an elevation of 144 feet (44 m) above mean sea level. It has one runway designated 1/19 with a turf surface measuring 2,800 by 85 feet (853 x 26 m).

For the 12-month period ending October 22, 2011, the airport had 450 aircraft operations, an average of 37 per month: 78% general aviation and 22% military. At that time there were 6 aircraft based at this airport, all single-engine.

References

External links 
  at North Carolina DOT airport guide
 Aerial image as of March 1993 from USGS The National Map
 

Airports in North Carolina
Transportation in Lenoir County, North Carolina
Buildings and structures in Lenoir County, North Carolina